The Mono Men were an American garage punk band, based in Bellingham, Washington. Their sound contained elements of grunge (distortion-heavy guitars, sneering vocals), but the Mono Men filtered these through a mimicry of 1960s Washington proto-punk, garage rock bands such as The Sonics.

History

The Mono Men rose up from the ashes of another Washington band, the Roofdogs.  John Mortensen came from the Dehumanizers and Game for Vultures before joining the Mono Men.  The band came together in late 1987.  They played shows in Europe, Mexico, Japan, Canada, and the United States.  They were featured in the Northwest Rock & Roll documentary Hype!.  Their albums all received generally positive reviews.  The band split in 1998, though in 2006, the Mono Men reunited to play a series of concerts called the "Spanish Attack."  The band reunited in 2013 to play shows in Bellingham and Seattle in the US, plus a tour in Latin America with shows in Mexico, Argentina and Brazil.

Trivia

Members of the Mono Men went to the same high school as the Fastbacks.
In 2006 the Mono Men launched the 5-show "Spanish Attack" tour with shows in Bellingham, WA and various venues in Spain.
Pearl Jam's Eddie Vedder performed Mono Men's "Watch Outside" with C Average in Alpine Valley 13.6.1999 (Tibetan Freedom Concert).

Members

Dave Crider (guitar, vocals)
Ledge Morrisette (bass)
Aaron Roeder (drums)
John Mortensen (guitar, vocals) (from late 1990)
Marx Wright (vocals, guitar) (1987–1990; 2013)

Discography

Albums and EPs

Stop Dragging Me Down (Estrus, 1990)
Wrecker (album)|Wrecker (Estrus, 1992)
Back to Mono (1+2 Records, 1992). The title is a reference to a Phil Spector slogan, advocating monophonic recording.
Shut the Fuck Up! (Estrus, 1993)
Bent Pages (Estrus, 1993)
Sin and Tonic (Estrus, 1994)
Those Mono Men Recorded Live at Tom's Strip and Bowl (Estrus, 1995)
Gypsy Woman Live (Impossible Records, 1995)
Ten Cool Ones (Scat, 1996)
 Have a Nice Day, Motherfucker (Estrus, 1997)

Split Singles

 1993 - Demolition Derby w/ Apeman Dragship
 1994 - Kronophonic w/ Stokastikats
 1995 - Gearhead w/ Girl Trouble

External links

 Band's Myspace
[ AMG entry]
Interview with Dave Crider
Crude but informative fan site

Grunge musical groups
Garage rock groups from Washington (state)
Garage punk groups
Musical groups established in 1987
Musical groups disestablished in 1998
Musical groups reestablished in 2006
Musical groups disestablished in 2006
Musical groups reestablished in 2013
Musical groups disestablished in 2013